Megaprosopus is a genus of bristle flies in the family Tachinidae. There are at least three described species in Megaprosopus.

Species
These three species belong to the genus Megaprosopus:
 Megaprosopus andinus Townsend, 1912
 Megaprosopus regalis (Reinhard, 1964)
 Megaprosopus rufiventris Macquart, 1843

References

Further reading

External links

 
 

Tachininae